Bijawar is a city  the state of Madhya Pradesh, India. It is the administrative headquarters of Bijawar Taluk, and was formerly the capital of a princely state of British India of the same name. The people of Bijawar are demanding the district status from their state government. It is the 53rd proposed district of Madhya Pradesh

History

The native state of Bijawar covered an area of 2520 km2 (973 sq. m.) in the Bundelkhand Agency. Forests covered nearly half the total area of the state, which was believed to be rich in minerals, but lack of transport facilities had hindered the development of its resources.

The state takes its name from the chief town, Bijawar, which was founded by Bijai Singh, one of the Gond chiefs of Garha Mandla, in the 17th century. The first ruler of the state was Bir Singh Deo (1765–93), a Bundela Rajput descended from the ruler of Orchha. It was conquered in the 18th century by Chhatarsal, the founder of Panna, a Rajput of the Bundela clan, by whose descendants it was held till its accession to India. It was confirmed to Ratan Singh in 1811 by the British government for the usual deed of allegiance. In 1857 Bhan Pratap Singh rendered signal services to the British during the Mutiny, being rewarded with certain privileges and a hereditary salute of eleven guns. In 1866 he received the title of Maharaja, and the prefix Sawai in 1877. Bhan Pratap was succeeded on his death in 1899 by his adopted son, Sanwant Singh, a son of the Maharaja of Orchha.

The state acceded to India on 1 January 1950, and became part of the state of Vindhya Pradesh, which was merged into Madhya Pradesh on 1 November 1956.

Bijawar is also known for Jatashankar, a holy place about 18 km from the town.
Bijawar is also known for Janki Nibas Temple because it is similar to Ayodhya Temple. Another famous temple, Kanchan Temple, was built by Maharani Kanchan Kuwar of Bijawar. Maharani Kanchan Kuwar was born in Karahiya and Princes of Karahiya and was the daughter of Rao Shahab of Karahiya.

Rulers
The rulers belonged to the Bundela dynasty.

Rajas
        1769 -        1793  Bir Singh Deo                      (b. ... - d. 1793)
        1793 -        1802  Himmat Bahadur
        1802 -    Dec 1810  Keshri Singh                       (b. ... - d. 1810)
        1811 -        1833  Ratan Singh
        1833 -        1847  Lakshman Singh
 23 Nov 1847 -        1866  Bham Pratap Singh

Maharajas (title from 1877 Sawai Maharaja)
        1866 - 15 Sep 1899  Bham Pratap Singh
    Jun 1900 - 30 Oct 1940  Savant Singh                       (b. 1877 - d. 1940)
 30 Oct 1940 – 15 Aug 1947  Govind Singh                       (b. 1934 - d. 1983)

Geography
It has an average elevation of 398 metres (1305 feet).

Demographics

As of the 2011 Census of India, Bijawar had a population of 20,513 - 10,838 males and 9,675 females, giving a sex ratio of 893 compared to the state average of 931. There were 2942 children aged 0–6 i.e. 14.34% of the population.  The literacy rate was 74.32% compared to a state average of 69.32%. Male literacy was 82.23% but female literacy was only 65.43%.

See also
Bijawar-Panna Plateau

References

Cities and towns in Chhindwara district
History of Madhya Pradesh
Bundelkhand
Chhatarpur